, also spelled Asou or Asoh, is a Japanese surname. People with this surname include:

, Japanese manga artist
, an alternate stage name of Marina Ōno, a Japanese voice actress and singer 
, Japanese manga artist 
, Japanese theatre and voice actress
, Japanese nobleman of the Azuchi-Momoyama era
, Japanese actress 
, Japanese singer and businesswoman
, Japanese voice actress
, Japanese actress and singer
, politician and 59th Prime Minister of Japan 
, Japanese governor of Fukuoka prefecture from 1995 to 2011
, Japanese actress

See also
ASO

Japanese-language surnames